The Catalan Courts or General Court of Catalonia ( or ) was the policymaking and parliamentary body of the Principality of Catalonia from the 13th to the 18th century.

Composed by the king and the three estates of the realm, the Courts took its definitive institutional form in 1283, according to historian Thomas Bisson, and it has been considered by several historians as a model of medieval parliament. Scholar Charles Howard McIlwain wrote that the General Court of Catalonia had a better defined organization than the parliaments of England or France. Unlike the Courts of Castile of the time which functioned mainly as an advisory body to which the king granted privileges and exemptions, the Catalan Courts was a regulatory body, as their decisions had the force of law, in the sense that the king could not unilaterally revoke them. It is comparable to similar institutions across Europe, such as the Parliament of England and the Diets of the German "lands".

The General Courts of the Crown of Aragon were the simultaneous meeting of the Courts of Aragon, the Courts of Valencia and the Courts of Catalonia. The Kingdom of Majorca did not convene Courts and thus sent their representatives to the Courts of the Principality. As the courts could not be held outside of Aragon nor the Principality, they were frequently held in Monzón or in Fraga, Aragonese towns which lay equidistant between Zaragoza and Barcelona.

The Catalan Courts met for almost five centuries, until they were abolished de facto by the Nueva Planta decrees of 1716. Thereafter the Courts of Castile operate as the unified Courts of Spain, except in Navarra. Despite some attempts to reestablish the Courts, Catalonia only recovered a legislative assembly in 1932.

Composition and legislative procedure 
The Courts were made up of three arms (Catalan: braços), representatives of the three estates of the realm: the military estate (Braç Militar) which included representatives from the nobility, the ecclesiastical estate (Braç Eclesiàstic) which saw representatives from the religious hierarchy and the royal estate (Braç Reial) which had representatives (known as síndics) from the municipalities and villages.

The ecclesiastical estate was presided by the Archbishop of Tarragona and comprised the Catalan bishops, the prior of Catalonia of the Knights Hospitaller, the castellan of Amposta, the abbots with possession of the abbey, the priors of convents with chapter, without superior in the Principality and with mer and mixed imperium over their vassals, the commanders of the Knights Hospitaller (in principle) and the chapters of the cathedrals. They were excluded the lower secular clergy and the mendicant orders.

The Courts were summoned and presided by the king as count of Barcelona who opened with a royal proclamation while the estates were in charge of legislating, always with the support of the sovereign. If the laws that were approved came from the king they received the name of "Constitutions" (Constitucions), if they came from the estates, "Court Chapters" (Capítols de Cort). If the king passed a law unilaterally it was called "Acts of Court" (Actes de Cort) and required ratification by the Courts.

History

Origins

The origin of the Catalan Courts is located in the Comital Court (Catalan: Cort Comtal) of Barcelona, circa 1000 and modelled after the Frankish Curia regis, and also follows the tradition of the meetings of the Peace and Truce that from 1021 met to discuss and agree on the termination of wars and feudal violence. One of the first precedents of the Catalan Courts date from 1192, the year in which the townspeople participated for the first time in the meeting of the Peace and Truce. The first Catalan legal code, the Usages of Barcelona, was promulgated by count Ramon Berenguer I based on the decisions of these assemblies.

The financial and military power of the counts of Barcelona was quite limited due to the impact of the Feudal revolution during the regency of countess Ermesinde of Carcassonne (1018–1044). Their personal resources were particularly insufficient in periods of economic crisis or military expansion, of which they were many from the twelfth to the fifteenth centuries. The need to secure troops and revenue led to the steady expansion of the Comital Court. After the dynastic union of the County of Barcelona and the Kingdom of Aragon, resulting in the Crown of Aragon (1164), it became the Royal Court.

The Royal Court of 1214 was convened by the papal legate, Cardinal Peter of Benevento in the Castle of la Suda, in Lleida and responded to the need to fix the confusing situation in the country after the death of King Peter of Aragon at the Battle of Muret (1213) and the beginning of the reign of his son James I who was only six years old. The new king of Aragon and count of Barcelona took his oath before prelates and magnates of the royal curia, representatives of cities and villages. At the time of James I (1208–1276), they met summoned by the king as representative of the social classes of the time. The Court of 1218 is the first that can be considered a General Court, because in 1214 there was a lack of representation of the municipalities and only one specific issue was debated.

Regulated Courts
Under the reign of Peter the Great (1276–1285), the Catalan Courts took institutional form.

Courts of 1283 
In the Courts held in Barcelona in 1283, the king was forced to hold a General Court once a year, with representative participation of the time, to discuss the good of the state and land reform. The king himself stated: «Volem, statuïm e ordenam: que si nós o los successors nostres constitutió alguna general o statut fer volrem en Cathalunya, aquella o aquell façam de approbatió e consentiment dels prelats, dels barons, dels cavallers e dels ciutadans de Cathalunya, o ells apellats, de la major e de la pus sana part de aquells». (from Catalan: "We want, we statue and we order: if we and our successors want to make any general constitution or statute in Catalonia, we will submit them to the approval and consent of the prelates, of the barons, of the knights and of the citizens or, from those apellates, of the largest and healthiest part of those."). That decision represented a radical change in the legislative procedure of the Principality: the Catalan Courts became officially a legislative body as the king would need the consent of the Courts in order to pass the legislation.

Courts of 1289 

In the Courts held in Monzón in 1289, a delegation of the General Court was appointed as a permanent council to collect the "service" or tribute that the arms granted to the king at his request. Later, this would give rise to the Deputation of the General or Generalitat of Catalonia, in the fourteenth century. Its regulation was also used to create in the fifteenth century the Valencian Generalitat (1418).

Courts of 1358 
In the Parliament of 1358–1359, held in Barcelona, Vilafranca del Penedès and Cervera under King Peter IV, Castile invaded the kingdoms of Aragon and Valencia. This caused a series of armed conflicts that resulted in considerable expenses to the Crown of Aragon. This circumstance prompted the Courts to appoint twelve deputies with executive powers in taxation and some oïdors de comptes ("auditors of accounts") who controlled the administration, constituting the Deputation of the General (Catalan: Diputació del General), later often known as "Generalitat", under the authority of Berenguer de Cruïlles, bishop of Girona, who is regarded as the first President of the Generalitat.

Courts of 1480 
In these Courts, the first ones of Ferdinand II the Catholic, many issues that remained pending after the Catalan Civil War (1462–1472) were resolved: the role of the Deputation of the General, the pactism and the return of properties. These last two points materialized in the recognition of a defeat shared by both sides, with more focus on seeking the reconstruction of the country than on the repression of the defeated. In these Courts the chapter Poc valdría was approved, later called "Constitution of the Observance" (Constitució de l'Observança), in which the obligation of the king to fulfill and to respect the constitutions of Catalonia is picked up. The chapter instructed the Deputation of the General to ensure its compliance, both by the king and his officers, and authorized it to revoke any unconstitutional order. It is considered a key piece of Catalan pactism.

Early modern history

Habsburg dynasty 
In 1519, the Courts met in Barcelona to recognize the first unified monarch of all the crowns of Castile and Aragon (resulting in the composite Monarchy of Spain), Charles I, and to discuss the granting of financial assistance to the Royal court. It was during the king's stay in Barcelona that he got the news that Charles had been elected emperor of the Holy Roman Empire under the name of Charles V.

During the period of the Habsburgs, the Catalan Courts were summoned less and less because of a supposed brake from the absolute power of the king. Therefore, the Generalitat, as the body responsible for ensuring compliance with the constitutions of Catalonia, gained in strength and prominence. In order to solve the lack of representation and get advice of the troubles of the Principality, the Generalitat frequently summoned the Junta de Braços (States-General), a non legislative assembly composed by members of the Catalan Courts which were in Barcelona at that time.

During the reign of Philip IV (1621–1665) tensions between Catalan institutions and the Monarchy arouse. In the Courts of 1626 the king tried to pass the proposal of Union of Arms designed by his chief minister Gaspar de Guzmán, Count-Duke of Olivares, demanding a military contribution from every realm of the Spanish Crown, including the Principality of Catalonia. However, the Courts were never concluded, due to the opposition of the estates to the measures of Olivares, many of which were contrary to the Catalan constitutions. Those events, coupled with the increased discomfort among Catalan population led to the Reapers' War (1640–1652).

Last Courts and suppression
The last General Court, presided by the disputed Habsburg king Charles III were held in Barcelona in 1705–1706, which, according to historian Joaquim Albareda, represented an important advance in the guarantee of individual, civil and political rights (among them, the establishment of the secrecy of correspondence), while at the same time they consolidated most of the constitutional reforms of the last previous Courts (1701–1702) such as the Court of Contraventions (Catalan: Tribunal de Contrafaccions), created in order to ensure the application of the constitutions and solve and prosecute any act (included the ones done by the king or his officers) contrary to the Catalan legislation.

The body was suppressed, like most of the other institutions and legislation of the Principality of Catalonia, after the end of the War of Spanish Succession in 1714, by the Nueva Planta decrees of 1716 enacted by the new Spanish king, the Bourbon Philip V, essentially establishing an absolutist system of government modelled after the French one. From that point on, the representatives of Catalonia, Aragon and Valencia were incorporated into the Courts of Castile which, unlike the suppressed Courts of the realms of the Crown of Aragon, operated primarily as an advisory body.

The current Parliament of Catalonia, established in 1932 as the legislative body of the Generalitat of Catalonia (Catalan institution of self-government), is considered the historical successor of the Courts.

See also
Parliament of Catalonia
Junta de Braços
Generalitat of Catalonia
Cortes Generales
History of democracy

References

Bibliography
 
 
 
 

Parliament of Catalonia
Politics of Catalonia
Catalan law
Historical legislatures
History of Catalonia
Principality of Catalonia
Medieval Catalonia
Early Modern Catalonia
1218 establishments in Europe
13th century in politics
18th century in politics